Caucau River is minor river in the city of Valdivia, southern Chile. Caucau River acts as a regulating channel between Cruces River and Calle-Calle River forming the Isla Teja island in front of the city centre. It confluence with Calle-Calle River marks the beginning of Valdivia River. '

The subsidence caused by the 1960 Valdivia earthquake caused a permanent flooding of parts botanical garden of the Austral University of Chile that were next to Caucau River.

References

Rivers of Chile
Rivers of Los Ríos Region